Zhuoxi Township is a mountain indigenous township in Hualien County, Taiwan, bisected by the Tropic of Cancer. It lies on the Central Mountain Range (up to 95% of its area) with steep mountains which makes it the highest township in the county. The population is 6,046 inhabitants, including Bunun people, Truku people and Seediq people. The main economic activity is agriculture.

Administrative divisions
The township comprises six villages: Gufeng, Lishan, Lunshan, Taiping, Zhuoqing and Zhuoxi.

Tourist attractions

 East Rift Valley National Scenic Park
 Luntian Recreation Area
 Nan'an Waterfall
 Walami Hiking Trail
 Yushan National Park

Transportation
 Provincial Highway 30

References

External links
East Rift Valley National Scenic Park
Yushan National Park

Townships in Hualien County